Banasa is a genus of plant feeding stink bugs in the family Pentatomidae.

Species
Banasa contains the following species:
 Banasa azteca Thomas
 Banasa calva (Say, 1832)
 Banasa dimidiata (Say, 1832) (green burgundy stink bug)
 Banasa dolobrata Thomas
 Banasa euchlora Stål, 1872 (juniper stink bug)
 Banasa excavata Thomas
 Banasa flavosa Thomas, 2005
 Banasa grisea Ruckes, 1957
 Banasa herbacea (Stål, 1872)
 Banasa induta Stål, 1860
 Banasa lenticularis Uhler, 1894
 Banasa packardii Stål, 1872
 Banasa rolstoni Thomas & Yonke, 1981
 Banasa salvini Distant, 1911
 Banasa sordida (Uhler, 1871)
 Banasa stalii
 Banasa subcarnea Van Duzee, 1935
 Banasa tumidifrons Thomas & Yonke, 1981

References

Pentatomidae genera
Pentatomini